is a Japanese professional footballer who plays as a left back for  club Albirex Niigata.

Club statistics
.

Honours
 Albirex Niigata
J2 League : 2022

 Individual
J2 League Best XI: 2022

References

External links
Profile at Albirex Niigata

1994 births
Living people
Association football people from Hokkaido
Japanese footballers
J1 League players
J2 League players
J3 League players
Hokkaido Consadole Sapporo players
Fukushima United FC players
Albirex Niigata players
Association football midfielders
Sportspeople from Sapporo